Pierre Paul Ferdinand Mourier de Neergaard (February 19, 1907 – November 13, 1987) was a Danish agronomist, mycologist and agriculturist.  Paul Neergaard is considered the father of seed pathology and, along with Scottish seed pathologist Mary Noble coined the term in the 1940s.

Biography
Neergaard was training in seed pathology at the Royal Veterinary and Agricultural University in Copenhagen, Denmark (B.Sc., 1932; Ph.D., 1935; Sc.D, 1945). He served as director of the Danish Government Institute of Seed Pathology for Developing Countries in Copenhagen. From 1956 to 1974 he served as the chairman of the Plant Disease Committee of the International Seed Testing Association (ISTA). During his tenure as the chair of the ISTA, he helped standardize methods for detecting seed-borne fungi.

Neergaard authored a two-volume text entitled Seed Pathology (1977), that focused on a wide variety of seed pathology issues, ranging from the economic significance of seed-borne diseases to the assessment of seed-borne inoculum. It has served as a reference and teaching standard for the science of seed pathology throughout the world. Along with Mary Noble and Jo deTempe, he produced  Annotated List of Seed-borne Diseases (4th edition, ISTA , 1990).

Neergard was a professor at universities in Beirut (Lebanon) and Mysore (Karnataka, India). and was a member of several national academies and international societies.

Paul Neergard was an active promoter of the international language Esperanto. He was a member of the Academy of Esperanto and published several books in that language about science and linguistics.

Selected works
Seed Pathology  (John Wiley & Sons, 1977)
Annotated List of Seed-borne Diseases (4th edition, ISTA , 1990)
1.-15. Årsberetning fra J. E. Ohlsens Enkes plantepatologiske laboratorium.

In Esperanto
Atakoj kontraŭ ĝardenplantoj
La vivo de la plantoj (The life of plants)
Terminaro Hortikultura (in six languages)
Eta Krestomatio
Tra Densa Mallumo
Fremdvortoj en Esperanto
Scienco kaj Pseŭdoscienco pri Heredo kaj Raso 
La Esperantologio kaj ties Disciplinoj. Taskoj kaj Rezultoj

References

1907 births
1987 deaths
People from Nyborg
Danish agronomists
Danish mycologists
Danish Esperantists
20th-century biologists
20th-century agronomists